ETF may refer to:

 Exchange-traded fund
 ETF Ride Systems, a Dutch amusement ride manufacturer
 ETF Securities, a British asset management firm
 Early termination fee
 Egyptian Tennis Federation
 Electron-transferring flavoprotein
 Emergency Task Force (TPS), of the Toronto Police Service
 Employees' Trust Fund, a social security program of the Government of Sri Lanka
 European Training Foundation, of the European Union
 European Transport Workers' Federation, in Brussels, Belgium
 Escape The Fate, American Rock Band
 Evangelical Theological Faculty, in Leuven, Belgium
 University of Belgrade School of Electrical Engineering,